Gerald Beresford Whitham FRS (13 December 1927 – 26 January 2014) was a British–born American applied mathematician and the Charles Lee Powell Professor of Applied Mathematics (Emeritus) of Applied & Computational Mathematics at the California Institute of Technology. He received his Ph.D. from the University of Manchester in 1953 under the direction of Sir James Lighthill. He is known for his work in fluid dynamics and waves.

Academic career
Whitham was born in Halifax, West Yorkshire. He received his Ph.D. from University of Manchester in 1953. He was a Faculty Member in the Department of Mathematics at the Massachusetts Institute of Technology during 1959–1962. He left MIT to join California Institute of Technology, Pasadena, California where he was instrumental in setting up the applied mathematics program in 1962.

Honors and awards
Whitham is a Fellow of the American Academy of Arts and Sciences since 1959. In 1965, Whitham was elected a Fellow of the Royal Society.

Whitham received the Norbert Wiener Prize in Applied Mathematics in 1980, jointly awarded by the Society for Industrial and Applied Mathematics (SIAM) and the American Mathematical Society (AMS). This prize was awarded "for an outstanding contribution to applied mathematics in the highest and broadest sense." Whitham was honored "for his broad contributions to the understanding of fluid dynamical phenomena and his innovative contributions to the methodology through which that understanding can be constructed".

Selected articles

Articles

 (See George C. McVittie.)

Books
 G. B. Whitham, Linear and Nonlinear Waves, John Wiley & Sons (1974).

References

External links

20th-century American mathematicians
21st-century American mathematicians
Massachusetts Institute of Technology School of Science faculty
California Institute of Technology faculty
Fellows of the Royal Society
Fellows of the American Academy of Arts and Sciences
Fluid dynamicists
People from Halifax, West Yorkshire
1927 births
2014 deaths
British emigrants to the United States